"Joker's Favor" is the eighth episode of Batman: The Animated Series. It was directed by Boyd Kirkland and written by Paul Dini, and first aired on September 11, 1992. The episode features the first appearance of The Joker's sidekick and love interest Harley Quinn, who was later introduced into the Batman comic book and eventually become a popular character in her own right. Batman himself only appears briefly in the episode.

Plot
Charlie Collins, a mild-mannered Gotham City accountant, is coming home from a bad day at work when he curses at a bad driver after other drivers have pushed him aside — who turns out to be the Joker. He tries to escape, but the Joker follows him and he is forced into the woods, where his car stops. He gets out, thinking he has escaped, but the Joker suddenly appears. Pleading for his life, he promises the Joker he will do anything if only he lets him go. Joker agrees to let him go and makes Charlie promise to do him a favor in return, taking his driver's license.

Although Charlie moves to another town and changes his name, the Joker tracks him down and calls him two years later to obtain the favor. He goes to the airport, where Harley Quinn is waiting for him. The favor is as follows: Charlie must go to a testimonial dinner for Commissioner Gordon and open a door. He agrees, but anxiously sets up a makeshift Bat-Signal before the testimonial starts. When he opens the door, Harley brings in a cake in which the Joker is hiding, and deploys nerve gas to immobilize the police. Emerging from the cake, the Joker places a bomb on the Commissioner's chest, then bids farewell to Charlie, who is trapped with his hand glued to the door handle. Batman arrives just in time to get rid of the bomb, which destroys the Joker's getaway van. A small fight ensues between Batman, his goons and Harley before he faces off with the Joker, who tries setting off another bomb. Batman is able to throw the bomb underground before it detonates.

Joker escapes in the commotion, only to bump into Charlie in an alleyway. The Joker laughs this off, but is surprised when Charlie belts him in the gut, knocking him into some garbage. In rage, the Joker repeats his threat, but Charlie produces one of Joker's bombs he has obtained and appears mad, and threatens to blow them both up to protect his family. Batman arrives just in time, and tells Charlie to stop, but he says if the Joker is jailed he'll just escape. Terrified, the Joker gives up all of the information that he has on Charlie to stop him. Charlie insists and throws the bomb at the Joker, who hides behind Batman. However, the bomb turns out to be a fake gag. The scene ends with Charlie saying "Gotcha!". Batman laughs and tells Charlie to go home as he arrests the Joker. Charlie then walks away happily.

See also 
 List of Batman: The Animated Series episodes

References

External links 
 

1992 American television episodes
Batman: The Animated Series episodes
Joker (character) in other media
Harley Quinn in other media